Avraham Eilam-Amzallag (born 28 September 1941) is an Israeli musician and composer.

Biography
Avraham (Avi) Eilam-Amzallag was born in Casablanca, Morocco. He immigrated to Israel as a child. He first studied the flute and later compositional studies at the Buchman-Mehta Music Academy in Tel Aviv.

Music career
He is the founder of an ensemble that performs oriental music. His compositions are described as a fusion of oriental Jewish music with contemporary technique.

Selected compositions
 Desolation [3:33 minutes]
  (composition for flute) (Mawal) [5:13 minutes]
 Music for flute and percussion (1975)
Composition

Published works
 Music for flute and percussion (1975).

See also
Music of Israel

References 

1941 births
Living people
20th-century Moroccan Jews
Israeli people of Moroccan-Jewish descent
Moroccan emigrants to Israel
Jewish Israeli musicians
Israeli flautists
Israeli male composers
20th-century Israeli male musicians
21st-century Israeli male musicians
20th-century flautists
21st-century flautists